Sarıyar is a village in the Amasya District, Amasya Province, Turkey. Its population is 287 (2021).

References

Villages in Amasya District